Lawrence Clyde Gowell (May 2, 1948 – May 11, 2020) was an American professional baseball player.

Gowell was drafted by the Yankees in the fourth round of the 1967 Major League Baseball draft on June 6, 1967. After winning every game he appeared in at Edward Little High School in Auburn, Maine, he was signed by the Yankees to a professional contract.

Major league career
The Yankees called up Gowell from their minor league organization in 1972 to play as a September call-up. Gowell made his major league debut on September 21 against the Milwaukee Brewers. The game was held at County Stadium, with 4,185 people attending the game. After Rusty Torres pinch hit for Fred Beene in the sixth inning, Gowell came in to replace Beene on the mound in the bottom of the sixth. He pitched two innings with one strikeout before Felipe Alou was called on to pinch-hit for him in the top of the eighth inning. The Yankees lost the game 6-4. On October 4, as a starting pitcher (again facing Milwaukee) Gowell hit a double on a 3–2 count, hitting a fastball by pitcher Jim Lonborg for his first and only Major League hit and the last hit by a pitcher in a regular season American League game before the start of the designated hitter rule. The baseball that Gowell hit now resides in the National Baseball Hall of Fame and Museum, in Cooperstown, New York. Although Gowell allowed only one run during that game, the Yankees lost 1–0. It was Gowell's only MLB decision.

Death
Gowell died while playing golf on May 11, 2020, aged 72.

References

External links

Baseball Almanac

1948 births
2020 deaths
Major League Baseball pitchers
New York Yankees players
Oneonta Yankees players
Kinston Eagles players
West Haven Yankees players
Manchester Yankees players
Fort Lauderdale Yankees players
Syracuse Chiefs players
Baseball players from Maine
Sportspeople from Lewiston, Maine
Sportspeople from Auburn, Maine
Edward Little High School alumni